Islamic Society of Employees is an Iranian principlist political party affiliated with the Front of Followers of the Line of the Imam and the Leader.

References 

Principlist political groups in Iran
1994 establishments in Iran
Political parties established in 1994